Five Questions: The New Journey is the ninth studio album by American recording artist Alexander O'Neal. O'Neal co-produced the album, and was credited as co-writer on the tracks, "I Found True Love", "You Make Me Smile", "Love Don't Love Nobody", "It's Your Night Tonight", and "5 Questions".

Track listing
"My House" (Noah Hickman) - 4:13
"I'm Back" (Hickman) - 2:47
"Minnesota Shuffle" (Hickman) - 3:53
"I Found True Love" (Billy Osborne, Toby Baker, Alexander O'Neal, Hickman) - 4:59
"I Can't Wait" (Al "Bossman" Demmings) - 4:01
"You Make Me Smile" (O'Neal, Kenny Wellington, Baker, Osborne) - 6:16
"Love Don't Love Nobody" (O'Neal, Mark Walker, Osborne, Gee Morris) - 4:26
"It's Your Night Tonight" (Baker, Osborne, O'Neal) - 4:11
"Love Won't Let Me Wait" (Bobby Eli, Vinnie Barrett) - 5:50
"5 Questions" (O'Neal, Morris, Osborne, Roland Hator, Eaaron Quacoe (Hator) - 4:40
"First Time" (Hickman) - 3:16

Personnel
Credits are adapted from the album's liner notes.

 "My House"
 Noah Hickman（:ja:ノア・ヒックマン） - Writer
 Beggar & Co. - horns

 "I'm Back"
 Noah Hickman（:ja:ノア・ヒックマン ）- Writer
 Beggar & Co. - horns

 "Minnesota Shuffle"
 Noah Hickman（:ja:ノア・ヒックマン ）- Writer
 Beggar & Co. - horns

 "I Found True Love"
 Toby Baker - guitars, bass guitar, keyboards
 Billy Osborne - drums, percussion programming
 Gee Morris - backing vocals
 Alexander O'Neal - backing vocals

 "I Can't Wait"
 Kevin Briggs - guitars
 Billy Osborne - drums, percussion programming
 Andy Whitmore - bass guitar
 Oli Langford - viola
 Tom Piggot-Smith - violin
 Oli Lewis - violin
 Danny Keane - cello
 Fenitrieus Thomas - backing vocals

 "You Make Me Smile"
 Toby Baker - keyboards
 Kenny Wellington - trumpet
 Billy Osborne - percussion
 Gee Morris - backing vocals
 Alexander O'Neal - backing vocals

 "Love Don't Love Nobody"
 Billy Osborne - drums, percussion programming
 Mark Walker - keyboards
 Oli Langford - violin 
 Oli Lewis - violin
 Rustom Pomeroy - viola
 Danny Keane - cello
 Gee Morris - backing vocals
 Alexander O'Neal - backing vocals

 "It's Your Night Tonight"
 Toby Baker - guitars, keyboards
 Billy Osborne - drums, percussion programming
 David Baptiste - saxophone
 Beggar & Co. - horns
 Kenny Wellington - trumpet 
 Harry Brown - trombone
 Gee Morris - backing vocals
 Alexander O'Neal - backing vocals

 "Love Won't Let Me Wait"
 Kevin Briggs - guitars
 Billy Osborne - drums, percussion programming
 Otto Williams - bass guitar
 Toby Baker - keyboards
 Andy Whitmore - strings
 Faye Jones - backing vocals
 Gee Morris - backing vocals
 Alexander O'Neal - backing vocals

 "5 Questions"
 Oli Langford - viola, violin
 Tom Piggot-Smith - violin
 Oli Lewis - violin
 Danny Keane - cello
 Gee Morris - backing vocals
 Alexander O'Neal - backing vocals
 Eaaron Quacoe(Hator)and Roland Hator - music composers 

 "First Time"
 Noah Hickman - Writer

Charts

References

External links

Alexander O'Neal albums
2010 albums